Sheraton may refer to:

Sheraton Hotels and Resorts, a hotel chain
Sheraton, County Durham, a village in County Durham, in England
Sheraton Centre (Barbados), a mall complex located in the parish of Christ Church, Barbados
Sheraton style, an 18th-century neoclassical furniture style, so called after Thomas Sheraton
Epiphone Sheraton, a guitar manufactured by Gibson's Epiphone division
Thomas Sheraton (1751 – 22 October 1806), English furniture designer
Mimi Sheraton, American food critic